BAP Victoria was an ironclad monitor built for the Peruvian Navy in the mid-1860s. The ship participated in the Battle of Callao in 1866 during the Chincha Islands War of 1864–66 and was not damaged. Her ultimate fate is unknown.

Description
The ship displaced . She was powered by a steam engine taken from a locomotive and was thus very slow. The ship was armed with a single smoothbore 64-pounder gun.

Construction and career
Designed by the brothers José Tomás and Manuel José Ramos, construction of Victoria began on 30 July 1864, when she was "commissioned" in the Peruvian Navy, at the Maestranza Naval de Bellavista shipyard in Callao, Peru. She was completed in early 1866.

Little is known of the ship's activities during the Battle of Callao on 2 May 1866, but she was struck by a single Spanish 68-pounder shell that failed to penetrate her armor. Nothing is known about any subsequent activities or her fate.

References

Bibliography 
 

 

Monitors of the Peruvian Navy